The Regal Constellation Hotel was a large hotel with focus on trade shows, convention and hospitality training centre near Pearson International Airport near Toronto, Ontario.

Renovations took place in 2001.

Once a popular hotel and convention venue, the hotel closed due to declining business and other setbacks, culminating with the SARS crisis. It was owned by Hong Kong-based Regal Hotels International.

In 2004, Hospitality Investors Group (HIG) of Scottsdale, Arizona acquired the site and was planning to add a 350-room hotel to the existing 800-room hotel. Construction was planned to begin in 2005. However, following the acquisition, HIG was broken up and one of its chief officers formed a new organization, Alatau Hospitality, with the principal shareholders of Lancaster Group of Kazakhstan. Alatau Hospitality retained the domain name of HIG (hospitalityinvestors.com), however its web site did not list the hotel as one of its current construction projects. As of November 2007, it was not clear who owned the property.

As of July 15, 2011 Urbacon was given the contract to completely demolish the old hotel. The property was then sold to Park'N Fly Canada. The former hotel structure was fully razed by January 2012.

Gallery: Abandoned, October 2007

References

Hospitality Investors Group Acquires the 800 room Regal Constellation Hotel at Toronto Airport; Planning Repositioning and Renovation

Hotels in Toronto
Former skyscrapers
Demolished buildings and structures in Toronto
Buildings and structures demolished in 2011
Defunct hotels in Canada
Demolished hotels
Buildings and structures demolished in 2012